Yurmash (Yurmaş) is a rural locality (a village) in Imendyashevsky Selsoviet, Gafuriysky District, Bashkortostan, Russia. The population was 175 as of 2010. There are 2 streets.

Geography 
Yurmash is located 54 km northeast of Krasnousolsky (the district's administrative centre) by road. Aktashevo is the nearest rural locality.

References 

Rural localities in Gafuriysky District